Georissa is a genus of minute land snails, terrestrial gastropod mollusks in the family Hydrocenidae. Although the species are best known for living on the surface of limestone rocks, they are often also found in and on the vegetation and on non-calcareous rocks. One species, Georissa filiasaulae, is cavernicolous. It is only known from two caves in the Sepulut area of Sabah, Malaysian Borneo, where its above-ground sister species, Georissa saulae, inhabits the rocks outside of the cave, and is connected to the cave snail via narrow zones of hybridization at the cave entrances. Possibly, G. filiasaulae has evolved without ever having been fully separated from its ancestor, a process known as speciation-with-gene-flow.

Species
Species within the genus Georissa include:
Georissa anyiensis Khalik, Hendriks, Vermeulen & Schilthuizen, 2018
 Georissa bangueyensis E. A. Smith, 1895
Georissa bauensis Khalik, Hendriks, Vermeulen & Schilthuizen, 2018
 Georissa biangulata Quadras & Möllendorff, 1894
 Georissa borneensis E. A. Smith, 1895
 Georissa elegans Quadras & Möllendorff, 1894
 Georissa everetti E. A. Smith, 1895
 Georissa filiasaulae Haase & Schilthuizen, 2007
 Georissa gomantongensis E.A. Smith, 1894
 Georissa hadra Thompson & Dance, 1983
 Georissa hosei Godwin-Austen, 1889
 Georissa japonica Pilsbry, 1900
Georissa kinabatanganensis Khalik, Hendriks, Vermeulen & Schilthuizen, 2018
 Georissa kobelti Gredler, 1902
 Georissa laevigata Quadras & Möllendorff, 1894
 Georissa laseroni (Iredale, 1937)
 Georissa mawsmaiensis Das & Aravind, 2021 
 Georissa monterosatiana Godwin-Austen & Neville, 1879
Georissa muluensis Khalik, Hendriks, Vermeulen & Schilthuizen, 2018
 Georissa niahensis Godwin-Austen, 1889
 Georissa pachysoma Vermeulen & Junau, 2007
 Georissa purchasi
 Georissa pyrrhoderma Thompson & Dance 1983
 Georissa pyxis (Benson, 1856) - type species of the genus Georissa
 Georissa rufula von Möllendorf, 1900
 Georissa saulae (van Benthem-Jutting, 1966)
 Georissa scalinella (van Benthem-Jutting, 1966)
 Georissa semisculpta
Georissa sepulutensis Khalik, Hendriks, Vermeulen & Schilthuizen, 2018
 Georissa shikokuensis Amano, 1939
 Georissa silaburensis Khalik, Hendriks, Vermeulen & Schilthuizen, 2018
 Georissa similis E.A. Smith, 1894
 Georissa vesta Thompson & Dance, 1983
 Georissa williamsi Godwin-Austen, 1889 (including Georissa hungerfordi)

References

External links 
 

Gastropod genera
Hydrocenidae
Gastropods of Asia
Molluscs of Oceania
Taxonomy articles created by Polbot